Metcalf Lake is a lake located northeast of Hoffmeister, New York. Fish species present in the lake are brook trout, and black bullhead. There is trail off Wilmurt Lake Road. No motors are allowed on this lake.

References

Lakes of New York (state)
Lakes of Hamilton County, New York